Harry Black may refer to:

Harry Black (UNICEF) (born 1934), Canadian humanitarian
Harry Black (politician) (born 1947), Australian politician
Harry Black (city manager) (born 1963), city manager of Cincinnati, Ohio
Harry Crawford Black (1887–1956), American businessperson, newspaper executive and philanthropist
Harry Black (novel), a 1956 novel by David Walker
Harry Black (film), a 1958 British film adaptation of the novel
Harry Black (River City), fictional character in Scottish soap opera River City
Harry S. Black, son-in-law of George A. Fuller, who took over Fuller's company after he died
Harry A. Black (1879–1923), Vermont attorney and public official

See also
Henry Black (disambiguation)
Harold Stephen Black (1898–1983), American electrical engineer

Black, Harry